Marttila (i.e. "Saint Martin's") is a municipality of Finland. It is located in the province of Western Finland and is part of the Southwest Finland region.

The municipality is unilingually Finnish.

Marttila's neighbouring municipalities are Koski Tl, Lieto, Loimaa, Paimio, Pöytyä and Salo.

History

During the Swedish domestic war regarding who was to be king, an important battle took place here 29 August 1599. Troops under Axel Kurck, supporting king Sigismund were defeated by troops supported duke Karl, soon to be king Karl IX. Karl more or less already ruled Sweden and what is Finland nowadays, and Sigismund were based in Poland. There is a memorial, erected 1934, to be seen in Marttila.
Martilla is along what at that time was called "Tavastlands Oxväg", in Finnish language now posted as "Hämeen Härkätie" which in English translates to "Oxroad of Häme".

Notable people
 Sirkka-Liisa Anttila (born 1943), politician; the former Minister of Agriculture and Forestry
 Lauri Heikkilä (born 1957), politician
 Simo Laaksonen (born 1998), racing driver

Gallery

References

External links

Municipalities of Southwest Finland
Populated places established in the 1400s